Renate Kuin (born ) is a Paralympian athlete from Netherlands competing mainly in category C5-8 shot and discus events.

Renate won the bronze medal in both the C5-8 shot and discus events at the 1992 Summer Paralympics in Atlanta.

External links
 profile on paralympic.org

1963 births
Living people
Dutch female discus throwers
Dutch female shot putters
Paralympic athletes of the Netherlands
Athletes (track and field) at the 1992 Summer Paralympics
Paralympic bronze medalists for the Netherlands
Medalists at the 1992 Summer Paralympics
Sportspeople from Apeldoorn
Paralympic medalists in athletics (track and field)
20th-century Dutch women